Felix Inglesby Moses  (May 13, 1853 – May 5, 1888) was a professional baseball manager for the 1884 Richmond Virginians. His career managerial record was 12-30 with a .286 winning percentage.

External links
 Baseball Managerial record

1853 births
1888 deaths
Baseball managers
Sportspeople from New York City